Walmart Labs (formerly named Kosmix and @WalmartLabs) became part of Walmart Global Tech, the technology and business services organization within Walmart. Venky Harinarayan and Anand Rajaraman founded Kosmix in 2005. In April 2011, Walmart acquired Kosmix and formed @WalmartLabs, a research division, out of it. In 2016, Walmart combined Walmart Labs and its information systems division (ISD) into one team called Walmart Technology. In August 2020, Walmart Technology launched its new identity as Walmart Global Tech as part of a new technology and shared services organization within the world's largest retailer.

History

Kosmix 
Harinarayan and Rajaraman were co-founders of Junglee, the first shopping search engine which was acquired by Amazon.com in 1998. They later created Amazon.com's Mechanical Turk and started an early-stage VC fund, Cambrian Ventures, that backed several companies later acquired by Google.

Kosmix expanded its focus from vertical to a horizontal search engine in June 2008, covering all subjects. For a key word or topic that a user enters, "Kosmix gathers content from across the Web to build a sort of multimedia encyclopedia entry on the fly. The company has built a taxonomy of nearly five million categories on a wide range of topics. The taxonomy includes millions of connections mapping the relationship among those categories."

Growth 
In June 2007, Kosmix announced a partnership with Revolution Health, in which Revolution Health will utilize Kosmix to enhance content searches on RevolutionHealth.com.

Truveo announced in September 2007 that the company's video search engine is being used by Kosmix to present topic-relevant videos on its health site RightHealth, giving users a starting point to explore health topics.
As of March 2008, Kosmix' market-share had grown 730% year-over-year. RightHealth was the #2 health site on the Web, according to Hitwise. Kosmix launched a personal news site called MeeHive in March, 2008 which is similar to Google News or My Yahoo!, but allows users to customize their interests to a greater degree. Meehive was shut down in October 2010. Kosmix launched tweetbeat in June 2010 as it entered the social media arena.

In October 2009, Kosmix acquired Cruxlux, an engine designed to take any two people, places, or things and tell the user how they are connected. Cruxlux was founded in 2007 by Guha Jayachandran and Curtis Spencer and was in private beta at the time of the acquisition. The terms of the deal are mostly unknown, other than that it was made in both cash and stock.

In April 2011, Kosmix announced a partnership with Ask The Doctor, in which their website AskTheDoctor.com would provide Q & A format medical content for Kosmix's website RightHealth.

Acquisition by Walmart 
Kosmix was acquired by Walmart in April/May 2011 and became @WalmartLabs for a rumored amount of $300 million. In June 2012, Harinarayan and Rajaraman announced that they would be leaving the company to take some time off, with no immediate plans.

In June 2013, Walmart bought predictive intelligence startup Inkiru to add analytics capabilities. In June 2018, Walmart announced it would hire 2,000 additional employees into Walmart Labs to improve the company's online grocery shopping platform. In July 2019, it acquired health tech startup FloCare and B2B wholesale trading platform BigTrade to bolster its customer service.

Walmart Global Tech 
Walmart Global Tech develops and manages the foundational technologies on which Walmart Inc.'s customer experiences are built, including cloud, data, enterprise architecture, DevOps, infrastructure and security. The tech organization powers Walmart Inc. and its business units, including Walmart U.S., Sam's Club and Walmart International. It is also an enterprise services organization that develops solutions to help 2.3 million Walmart and Sam’s Club associates work and live better. Walmart Global Tech is led by Suresh Kumar, Executive Vice President, Chief Technology Officer and Chief Development Officer for Walmart Inc.

Notes

External links 
 

Digital marketing companies of the United States
Privately held companies based in California
Companies based in Mountain View, California
Technology companies based in the San Francisco Bay Area
Walmart brands
2011 mergers and acquisitions